Archichlora alophias is a species of moth of the  family Geometridae. It is found in central Madagascar, often near Antananarivo.

Description 

The male of this species has a length of the forewings of 11.5-12.5 mm. Its antennae are bipectinated. Vertex, first segment of thorax and upper side of the thorax are green, the underside of the other segments of the thorax are clear brown. The upper side of the forewings is green with 4 hyaline spots and a black spot, the borders are reddish.

Subspecies
Archichlora alophias alophias	Herbulot, 1954
Archichlora alophias catalai 	Herbulot, 1954

References

External links 

Geometrinae
Moths described in 1954
Moths of Madagascar
Moths of Africa